Joseph B. Walther (born 1958) is the Mark and Susan Bertelsen Presidential Chair in Technology and Society and the Director of the Center for Information Technology & Society at the University of California, Santa Barbara. His research focuses on social and interpersonal dynamics of computer-mediated communication, in groups, personal relationships, organizational and educational settings. He is noted for creating social information processing theory in 1992 and the hyperpersonal model in 1996.

Life and work
Joseph B. Walther was born in 1958 in Santa Monica, Calif. Walther attended Sana Ana College, Saddleback College and spent time with the Royal Shakespeare Company at Coastline Community College before transferring to the University of Arizona and graduating magna cum laude in 1983. Walther continued at the University of Arizona, earning a master's degree in speech communication in 1984 and a doctorate in 1990.

Walther has previously held appointments in Information Technology, Psychology, and Education and Social Policy at universities in the U.S. and the United Kingdom and was chair of the Organizational Communication and Information Systems division of the Academy of Management, and the Communication and Technology division of the International Communication Association.

Based on his research into computer-mediated communication, Walther introduced social information processing theory in 1992. Social information processing theory finds that the development of relationships via computer-mediated communication depends on sufficient time and message exchanges, and on the application of available communicative cues by users. The lack of nonverbal cues means that computer-mediated communications contain less information than face-to-face communications, however social information processing theory finds that longer and/or more frequent communication  as well as the use of other cues (i.e. spelling ability)  while participating in computer-mediated communication help address the issue of information exchange.

The social information perspective assumes that communicators in computer-mediated exchanges are similarly driven to acquire social information that will encourage the development of social relationships as are communicators using other media. Support for social information processing theory has been found in contexts such as online dating and online multi-player video games.

Walther's research also led him to develop the hyperpersonal model of communication in 1996. Walther's work on the hyperpersonal model is his research that has been most cited by other researchers. The hyperpersonal model finds that in certain circumstances, computer-mediated communication surpasses the affection and emotion of similar situations of face-to-face interpersonal communication. This model also offers a robust view of computer-mediated communication, taking into account the contributions of the sender, receiver, channel and feedback in a computer-mediated interaction.

The hyperpersonal model finds that two characteristics of computer-mediated communication – reduced communication cues and potentially asynchronous communication – facilitate both optimized self-presentation by message senders and idealized perceptions of the sender by message receivers. Walther's hyperpersonal model predicts that media classified as less rich by media richness theory or less natural by media naturalness theory allow more socially desirable levels of interaction than face-to-face communication.

Academic appointments
 1990-1992: Assistant Professor, Dept. of Communication, University of Oklahoma
 Fall 1995: Visiting Professor, Dept. of Psychology, University of Manchester
 1992-1997: Assistant Professor of Communication Studies, Northwestern University
 1995-1996: Ameritech Research Professor, Northwestern University
 1995-1997: Assistant Professor of Education and Social Policy, Northwestern University
 Spring, 1999: Adjunct Associate Professor (Virtual) of Communication Studies, University of Kansas
 1997-2002: Associate Professor in Language, Literature, & Communication, Social Psychology, and Information Technology, Rensselaer Polytechnic Institute
 May, 2005: Visiting Professor, School of Communication Studies, Kent State University
 2002-2006: Associate Professor, Professor in Communication, Information Science, Cornell University
 2006- 2013: Professor, Dept. of Communication, Michigan State University & Professor, Dept. of Telecommunication, Information Studies and Media, Michigan State University
 2013 - 2017: Wee Kim Wee Professor, Division of Communication Research, Nanyang Technological University
2017- Present: Mark and Susan Bertelsen Presidential Chair in Technology and Society; Director of the Center for Information Technology & Society, UC Santa Barbara

Bibliography
Selected works:

See also
 Social information processing (theory)
 Hyperpersonal model
 Computer-mediated communication
 Warranting theory
 Relational Maintenance and CMC - Tie Signs

References

External links 
 https://web.archive.org/web/20111228224314/http://www.tism.msu.edu/users/joseph-walther
 https://michiganstate.academia.edu/JosephWalther

Living people
Michigan State University faculty
Cornell University faculty
1958 births